Novocriniidae is a family of crustaceans belonging to the order Harpacticoida.

Genera:
 Atergopedia Martínez Arbizu & Moura, 1998
 Novocrinia Huys & Iliffe, 1998

References

Harpacticoida